Dhamrai is an upazila of Dhaka District in the Division of Dhaka, Bangladesh.

Geography
Dhamrai Upazila is located about 40 kilometers northwest of the capital city of Dhaka. It is one of the six Upazilas of the Dhaka district. The Upazila is surrounded by the Upazilas of Mirzapur and Kaliakair and Nagarpur on the north, Singair on the south, Savar in the east, and Saturia on the west.

Dhamrai is located within the coordinates of 90.02 - 90.14E and 23.50 - 24.02E. The total area of Dhamrai Upazila is 307.4 km2. It has 57,297 units of households. The Upazila consists of one municipality (Pouroshova), 16 unions, and 398 villages.

Dhamrai Upazila is composed of the alluvium soil of the Bongshi and Dholesshori rivers. Other rivers are Kolmai and Gazikhali.

Demographics
At the 1991 Bangladesh census, Dhamrai had a population of 312,777. Males constituted 50.37% of the population, and females constituted 49.63%. The population of citizens 18 years and older was 163,449. Dhamrai had an average literacy rate of 29.5% (7+ years), lower than the national average of 32.4%.
The breakdown of Population is as follows:

Total Population:  		312,777;
Male: 				157,546;
Female:				155,231;
Density:			1,146/km2;
Population Growth Rate:		1.59;
Birth Rate:			2.0
Chapil Total Villager:10,000

Administration
Dhamrai Upazila is divided into Dhamrai Municipality and 16 union parishads: Amta, Baisakanda, Balia, Bhararia, Chauhat, Dhamrai, Gangutia, Jadabpur, Kulla, Kushura, Nannar, Rowail, Sanora, Sombhog, Suapur, and Sutipara. The union parishads are subdivided into 306 mauzas and 396 villages.

Dhamrai Municipality is subdivided into 9 wards and 44 mahallas.

History

There are two theories on the naming of Dhamrai. The first is that during the time of Ashoka, there was a Buddhist called Dharmarajika and that the area was named after him. The discovery of a Buddhist stupa in Savar, about 10 miles from Dhamrai, lends credence to this opinion. Another theory is that in the early fourteenth century, five companions of the Sufi saint Shah Jalal (Tirmidhi Al-Husayni, Haji, Ghazi, Zam Bahadur, and Shah Makhdum) came and settled in the sparsely populated and heavily forested area. Food supplies ultimately ran short and one day they found a stray cow wandering about which they slaughtered the cattle to eat and satisfy their hunger. After a few days, they were approached by Dhama Gope and his wife Rai Goalini who claimed that the cow was theirs and demanded compensation for it. The Sufis learnt that the couple was childless. It is said that with their blessings a child was born to the couple and also they said that they would name the place so that their names would forever be remembered. Thus the name Dhamrai (Dham+Rai) came about.

Dhamrai was once under the Thana (now Upazila) of Savar. Dhamrai became a Thana itself in 1914 during the British rule; the same year Dhamrai Hardinge High School was established. In 1947 it was put under the district of Dhaka. On December 15, 1984, Dhamrai was upgraded into a full-fledged Upazila.

Economy
The total cultivable land is 23,470 hectares. Of the total cultivable land (in hectares):

1 crop: 2,050
2 crop: 14,580
3 crop: 6,740
More than 3 crops: 100
Intensity of Cultivation: 220.83%

Farmers by Land Occupancy:

Landless (less than 0.02 hectares): 11,755
Marginal (0.02 - 0.20 hectares): 10,670
Middle (1.01 - 3.0 hectares): 5,675
Big (more than 3.0 hectares): 535

Food Production:

Total demand (metric tons): 65,209
Actual production (metric tons): 75,023
Total Surplus (metric tons): 9,814

Culture

Dhamrai Roth Jatra And Fair: The annual Jagannath Roth Jatra is a famous Hindu festival attracting thousands of people. Dhamrai is well known for this annual festival all throughout Bangladesh. Roth jatra festival begins on around the 10 days of Bangla Calendar month of Ashar and "Ulto Roth" takes place one week after. A month-long Roth Maela (রথ মেলা) is held in Dhamrai for this occasion. This commemorates the annual journey of Lord Jagannath, Lord Balarama, and their sister Subhadra to their aunt's temple. During the festival, devotees help pull the Lords' chariot with ropes. They consider this a pious deed and risk their lives in the huge crowd. The huge processions accompanying the chariots play devotional songs with drums, tambourines, trumpets, etc. Children line the streets through which the chariot will pass and add to the mass chorus. The Roth cart is approximately 45 feet (14 m) high and pulled by the pilgrims who turn up for the event.

Metal Casting: The main center for metal casting in Bangladesh is in Dhamrai. For many generations, this place has produced handmade metal (Bronze)ware for markets throughout Bangladesh, using the lost wax casting (cire perdue) method and hollow casting method that is over 2,000 years old. These methods are used to make items ranging from ornate Hindu and Buddhist statues to simple household objects such as pitchers (kolshi as is locally called) and also items include quality statues, decanters, bowls, spoons, and plates. Over the past fifty years, many of the families in Bangladesh who have been involved in the metal casting trade have taken on other work. With stiff competition from inexpensive machine-made aluminium and plastic products coming in from India and other countries in the region, the market for hand-cast items has gradually dwindled away. As a result, the tradition of making handmade cast metal objects is in jeopardy. For example, there are only six people left in Bangladesh who are capable of making masterpiece-quality Hindu and Buddhist images using the lost wax method. Twenty years ago, there were over 30 craftsmen who knew this technique. If this trade is someday lost, an important part of Bangladesh's artistic tradition will vanish forever.
Dhamrai is also well known for pottery.

NGOs working in Dhamrai:
 SOJAG: Works throughout Dhamrai and adjoining Upazilas of Mirzapur, Shaturia, Kaliakoir, and Singair. The headquarters is at village Shailan under Shombhag Union.
 Grameen Choa: Located at Dhantara Bazar, Dhamrai
 SDI: Located at Dhamrai Bazar, Dhamrai
 ASA: Located at, Dhamrai, Shimulia, Dhantara, Kalampur, Kushura, Kawalipara, Bathuli, Suapur.

Education 
There are 139 Government Primary schools; 16 High Schools; 25 Junior High Schools; 109 schools run by NGOs; 11 Madrasahs, 6 Colleges, and 1 Agriculture College in Dhamrai Upazila.

High schools
depashai big center mosque
Chapil Big Mosque,Dhamrai,Dhaka
Chapil Hafizia Madrasha
Haralal High School, Amta Established in 1887
Hamida-Afaz Girls High School, Kushura
Ruail High School: Established in 1857, is one of the oldest schools not only in Dhamrai but of India and Bangladesh. It is one of the four schools established in British India as early as 1857, the year of the Sepoy Mutiny;
Dhamrai Hardinge High School & College : Established in 1914 after the British Viceroy Lord Hardinge;
Elokeshi High School, Jalshin: Established in 1924;
Jadavpur B M High School: Established in 1929;
Berosh Shibnath Shastri Institution: Established in 1936;
Suapur Nannar High School: Established in 1939;
Kushura Abbas Ali High School: Established in 1941;
Bhalum Ataur Rahman Khan High School: Established in 1957;
Balia Wadudur Rahman High School: Established in 1957;
Dhamrai Girls' High School: Established in 1959;
Beliswar Mohini Mohon High School: Established in 1967;
Nikla Z. Haque High School: Established in 1970;
Bannol Lakkhu Haji High School: Established in 1969;
Jalsha High School: Established in 1972;
Shailan Surma High School: Established in 1973;
Afazuddin High School: Established in 1988
Dokkshin Bannal Govt. Primary School(Former Bannal old scheme junior Madrasah):Established in 1935.
Shailan Surma High School
Chapil Govt. Primary School
Rajapur Kahela Baharam Mollik High School, Established in 1985.
 Dhalkunda high school; Established in 1973

Colleges
Dhamrai Govt. University College: is the highest educational institute of the locality.
Dhamrai Hardinge High School and College
Nobojug University College: Established in 1972 in Kushura;
Abul Bashar Krishi College: Established in 2003 in Mongolbari, Dhamrai;
Bhalum Ataur Rahman School Degree College: Established in 1987, Bhalum, Kalampur;
Afaz Uddin School & College: Established in 1988 in Sharifbag, Dhamrai.
Rajapur Begum Anowara Girls' College: Established in Rajapur, Dhamrai.
 Monmon school & college:

Gallery

See also
Upazilas of Bangladesh
Districts of Bangladesh
Divisions of Bangladesh
Savar
Brassware Industry in Bangladesh

References

Upazilas of Dhaka District